JSI may refer to:

 Japan Science Institute, now IBM Research – Tokyo, a Japanese research lab
 John Shea Insurance Canada Cup Qualifier, a former Canadian curling bonspiel
 John Snow, Inc, an American public health research and consulting firm
 Skiathos Island National Airport, in Greece
 Jožef Stefan Institute, a scientific institute located in Ljubljana, Slovenia

See also
 JS-1 (disambiguation)